Vladimir "Vladica" Kovačević (7 January 1940 – 28 July 2016) was a Yugoslav and Serbian footballer who played as a forward.

Club career
Born in Ivanjica, Kovačević moved to Belgrade in 1955 and joined the youth system of Partizan. He was promoted to the first team in 1958, making his official debut in a 2–1 home league win over Rijeka. During the next eight seasons, Kovačević helped Partizan win the Yugoslav First League on four occasions (1960–61, 1961–62, 1962–63, and 1964–65). He was also a member of the team that lost the 1966 European Cup Final to Real Madrid. Two years earlier, Kovačević was the competition's joint top scorer with seven goals, along with Sandro Mazzola and Ferenc Puskás.

In 1966, Kovačević moved abroad to France and signed with Nantes, spending there just one season. He subsequently returned to Yugoslavia to perform his compulsory military service and rejoined Partizan. In late 1969, Kovačević moved back to France and joined Angers.

International career
At international level, Kovačević earned 13 caps for Yugoslavia between 1960 and 1965, scoring two goals. He was a member of the team at the 1962 FIFA World Cup, as Yugoslavia lost to Chile in the third-place match.

International goals
Scores and results list Yugoslavia's goal tally first.

Honours

Club
Partizan
 Yugoslav First League: 1960–61, 1961–62, 1962–63, 1964–65

Individual
 European Cup Top Scorer: 1963–64

References

External links
 
 
 
 

1962 FIFA World Cup players
Angers SCO players
Association football forwards
Expatriate football managers in France
Expatriate footballers in France
FC Nantes players
FK Partizan non-playing staff
FK Partizan players
Ligue 1 managers
Ligue 1 players
Olympique Lyonnais managers
People from Ivanjica
Serbian football managers
Serbian footballers
Yugoslav expatriate football managers
Yugoslav expatriate footballers
Yugoslav expatriate sportspeople in France
Yugoslav First League players
Yugoslav football managers
Yugoslav footballers
Yugoslavia international footballers
UEFA Champions League top scorers
1940 births
2016 deaths